The Sagaing Fault is a major fault in Myanmar, a mainly continental right-lateral transform fault between the Indian Plate and Sunda Plate. It links the divergent boundary in the Andaman Sea with the zone of active continental collision along the Himalayan front.  It passes through populated cities of Mandalay, Yamethin, Pyinmana, the capital Naypyidaw, Toungoo and Pegu before dropping off into the Gulf of Martaban, running for a total length of over 1200 kilometers.

Geomorphology 
The Sagaing Fault begins offshore in the Andaman Sea before passing through the central Myanmar basin. The fault has a relatively low topographical relief for most of its length compared to the Shan Scarp Fault to the west.

Slip rate and displacement 
The total slip rate across the Indian–Sunda Plate boundary is about 35 mm/yr, of which 18 mm/yr is accommodated by the Sagaing Fault, according to GPS data. The measured maximum displacement along the fault is about 100 km, although several authors have proposed between 360 km to 400 km.

Seismicity

Damaging earthquakes have been associated with the fault for centuries. The great 1839 Ava earthquake killed hundreds and damaged many cities, including the then imperial capital Inwa. That earthquake is thought to have a moment magnitude of 8.0 or greater. The large magnitude would imply a rupture length of at least 300 km along the fault.

In the early 20th century, from 1929–1931, more than half the length of the Sagaing Fault was involved in significant earthquakes. The first earthquake that would be followed-up by subsequent larger events struck southwest of Nay Pyi Daw, and east of Thayetmyo in the Pegu Range in August 1929. There is insufficient reports of damage caused by this earthquake although it was said that buildings were swaying and objects were displaced at Yamethin, roughly 133.6 km north of the quake epicenter. The magnitude of this earthquake was no greater than 7.0.

On the night of May 5, a large shock registering  7.5 struck north of the city of Pegu resulting in widespread deaths and destruction.  There were no foreshocks that preceded. The earthquake had a maximum intensity of IX to X on the Rossi-Forel scale. The city of Pegu, Rangoon and several other towns were destroyed. In Pegu, fires erupted, and severe liquefaction caused further damage. Approximately 500 people died in Pegu while 58 were killed in Rangoon, more deaths were recorded in other villages. It triggered a small tsunami in that inundated villages along the coast. This is the deadliest earthquake in the 1929–1931 sequence.

The night of December 3 was disturbed by two moderate foreshocks, the first lasting 5 seconds generated some panic, it was felt in Pyinmana and Rangoon and another that was described as being stronger than the first but was not felt as widespread as the first. 

The early morning of December 4 in Pyu, Taungoo District was suddenly disrupted by violent shaking from an  7.3 earthquake. The December 4 event occurred further north of the epicenter of the May earthquake, about 6.4 to 9.7 km west southwest of Pyu. Damage was severe, a railroad was shifted off and twisted while many buildings in the city collapsed. About 30 people were killed. The maximum intensity was assigned X on the Rossi–Forel scale. This event is not an aftershock of the May quake because it ruptured a different segment of the Sagaing Fault.

Although the May and December 1930 earthquakes occurred during this active period, they were separate events, unrelated to the activity in the northern part. The December 1930 earthquake, however, was triggered due to stress transfer from the previous event in May.

A lesser-known earthquake on July 18, 1930, in the Ayeyarwady Region killed about 50 people. According to the National Centers for Environmental Information database, there is no magnitude assigned to this event. The book Southeast Asia Association of Seismology is the only published work mentioning this event.

The largest earthquake in the sequence, an  7.6 quake struck next to Indawgyi Lake resulting in large landslides and ground failures. There were no casualties in this earthquake.

Another violent earthquake of unknown magnitude occurred 146.5 km north of Pyu. It was felt in Mandalay and Thanatpin. Six brick buildings sustained damage. On August 19, another tremor caused cracks to appear in buildings in Mandalay and lightly affected Kalaw. The city was rocked another time, resulted in the collapse of the Shwe Sandaw Pagoda in Taungoo.

Several short tremors were felt that woke people up in Taungoo, Pyuntaza and Nangyun.

Two powerful earthquakes north of Mandalay measuring 8.0 and 7.7 on the moment magnitude scale occurred on September 12, 1946. The doublet earthquake sequence would remain as one of the largest in the country. Not much about this event is known due to sparse records.

Looking back at the historical records of earthquakes, the years 1906 and 1908 saw two major events in the northernmost end of the Sagaing Fault. The 1906 Putao earthquake on August 31 had an estimated moment magnitude of 7.0, and the 1908 earthquake measured  7.5.

The 1908 earthquake resulted in the accumulation of stress towards the south, where the future 1931 quake would take place. Similarly, the 1946 earthquake rupture segments were directly south of the 1931 rupture. The first mainshock in the 1946 doublet sequence then triggered the second mainshock due to the sudden increase in stress levels on the fault. 

Ten years later, an  7.1 earthquake near Mandalay killed at least 40 people. That earthquake broke a segment south of the 1946 rupture. In 1991, a small seismic gap between the two 1946 ruptures generated an  7.0 earthquake, partially re-rupturing a small section of the 1946 quakes, killing two.

The 2012 Shwebo earthquake was the most recent major event on the Sagaing Fault. It had a moment magnitude of 6.8 and ruptured the fault north of Mandalay. A detailed and thorough evaluation of the event suggest the rupture was estimated at 45-km-long. The centroid moment tensor solution suggested the earthquake ruptured a north-south trending and sub-vertical fault that steeply dipped to the east.

See also
Geography of Myanmar
Geology of Myanmar

References

External links
 Earth Observatory of Singapore: Myanmar earthquake of March 24th - Magnitude 6.8 (Regional Tectonics Explained)
 In-depth Sagaing Fault Study of 2012 quake

Seismic faults of Asia
Geology of Myanmar
Earthquakes in Myanmar
Strike-slip faults
Geology of Asia
Active faults